The Ivishak River   is a  tributary of the Sagavanirktok River in the North Slope Borough of the U.S. state of Alaska. Fed by glaciers at the headwaters, the Ivishak flows northeast, then northwest, through the Philip Smith Mountains and the northern foothills of the Arctic National Wildlife Refuge. It enters the Sagavanirktok River on the coastal plain south of Prudhoe Bay.

On December 2, 1980,  of the Ivishak was designated a National Wild and Scenic River.  The protected segments, including the headwaters, an unnamed tributary from Porcupine Lake, and all but the lowermost part of the main stem, lie within the wildlife refuge.

See also
List of rivers of Alaska
List of National Wild and Scenic Rivers

References

Rivers of North Slope Borough, Alaska
Rivers of Alaska
Wild and Scenic Rivers of the United States